Nieszawa is a town in Kuyavian-Pomeranian Voivodeship, north-central Poland.

Statutes of Nieszawa, enacted in 1454
Nieszawa may also refer to the following villages:
Nieszawa, Lublin Voivodeship (east Poland)
Nieszawa, Greater Poland Voivodeship (west-central Poland)